The 2003 UEC European Track Championships were the European Championships for track cycling, for junior and under 23 riders. They took place in Moscow, Russia.

Medal summary

Open

Under 23

Juniors

Medal table

References

European Track Championships, 2003
European Track Championships
International cycle races hosted by Russia
Sports competitions in Moscow
2003 in Russian sport